In mathematics, the Hartley transform (HT) is an integral transform closely related to the Fourier transform (FT), but which transforms real-valued functions to real-valued functions. It was proposed as an alternative to the Fourier transform by Ralph V. L. Hartley in 1942, and is one of many known Fourier-related transforms. Compared to the Fourier transform, the Hartley transform has the advantages of transforming real functions to real functions (as opposed to requiring complex numbers) and of being its own inverse.

The discrete version of the transform, the discrete Hartley transform (DHT), was introduced by Ronald N. Bracewell in 1983.

The two-dimensional Hartley transform can be computed by an analog optical process similar to an optical Fourier transform (OFT), with the proposed advantage that only its amplitude and sign need to be determined rather than its complex phase. However, optical Hartley transforms do not seem to have seen widespread use.

Definition
The Hartley transform of a function  is defined by:

where  can in applications be an angular frequency and

is the cosine-and-sine (cas) or Hartley kernel. In engineering terms, this transform takes a signal (function) from the time-domain to the Hartley spectral domain (frequency domain).

Inverse transform 
The Hartley transform has the convenient property of being its own inverse (an involution):

Conventions 

The above is in accord with Hartley's original definition, but (as with the Fourier transform) various minor details are matters of convention and can be changed without altering the essential properties:

Relation to Fourier transform
This transform differs from the classic Fourier transform 
 in the choice of the kernel. In the Fourier transform, we have the exponential kernel,

where  is the imaginary unit.

The two transforms are closely related, however, and the Fourier transform (assuming it uses the same  normalization convention) can be computed from the Hartley transform via:

That is, the real and imaginary parts of the Fourier transform are simply given by the even and odd parts of the Hartley transform, respectively.

Conversely, for real-valued functions  the Hartley transform is given from the Fourier transform's real and imaginary parts:

where  and  denote the real and imaginary parts.

Properties 
The Hartley transform is a real linear operator, and is symmetric (and Hermitian).  From the symmetric and self-inverse properties, it follows that the transform is a unitary operator (indeed, orthogonal).

There is also an analogue of the convolution theorem for the Hartley transform. If two functions  and  have Hartley transforms  and  respectively, then their convolution  has the Hartley transform:

Similar to the Fourier transform, the Hartley transform of an even/odd function is even/odd, respectively.

cas 

The properties of the Hartley kernel, for which Hartley introduced the name cas for the function (from cosine and sine) in 1942, follow directly from trigonometry, and its definition as a phase-shifted trigonometric function  For example, it has an angle-addition identity of:

Additionally:

and its derivative is given by:

See also 
 cis (mathematics)
Fractional Fourier transform

References 

  (NB. Also translated into German and Russian.)

Further reading 
  (NB. Contains extensive bibliography.)

Integral transforms
Fourier analysis